Folk Songs & Bluegrass is the second studio album by the progressive bluegrass band The Country Gentlemen, recorded in 1961 and reissued in 1988.
Considered one of the best and classical records by the group, it features their 1st classic lineup with Charlie Waller, John Duffey, Tom Gray and Eddie Adcock.

Track listing
 Train 45 (Traditional) 2:26
 Little Bessie (Traditional) 3:26
 The Fields Have Turned Brown (Carter Stanley) 3:00
 They're At Rest Together (Traditional) 2:56
 Strutting on the Strings (Eddie Adcock) 2:26
 Remembrance of You (Pete Roberts) 2:49
 Red Rocking Chair (John Duffey, William York) 2:00
 Will the Circle Be Unbroken (Acuff, Christian) 2:50
 Handsome Molly (Duffey, Kuykendall) 2:26
 Victim to the Tomb (John Duffey) 3:38
 Behind These Prison Walls of Love (Bolick, Jarrard) 2:54
 Wear a Red Rose (John Duffey) 2:06
 I'm Coming Back, But I Don't Know When (Charlie Monroe) 3:05
 Southbound (John Duffey) 2:00
 Come All Ye Tender-Hearted (Traditional) 3:08
 Standing in the Need of Prayer (Traditional) 1:53

Personnel
 Charlie Waller - guitar, vocals
 John Duffey - mandolin, vocals
 Eddie Adcock - banjo, vocals
 Tom Gray - bass, vocals

References

1961 albums
Folkways Records albums
The Country Gentlemen albums
Smithsonian Folkways albums
Albums produced by Charlie Waller (American musician)
Albums produced by John Duffey
Albums produced by Eddie Adcock
Albums produced by Tom Gray